Mars and Venus with Cupid and a Dog is a  oil painting on canvas by Paolo Veronese. It was painted ca. 1580 and is in the collection of the National Gallery of Scotland in Edinburgh. Venus is portrayed wearing a fur and sitting on Mars' knee. At their feet are Cupid and a lapdog.

References

1580 paintings
Mythological paintings by Paolo Veronese
Paintings in the National Galleries of Scotland
Dogs in art
Paintings of Cupid
Paintings of Venus